José Alberto Cañas Ruiz-Herrera (born 27 May 1987) is a Spanish professional footballer who plays for Greek club Ionikos as a defensive midfielder.

He started his career with Real Betis, joining the first team in 2009 and going on to make 72 official appearances, 51 in La Liga, over three seasons, and spent 2013–14 in the Premier League with Swansea City.

Club career

Betis
A product of Real Betis' youth ranks, Cañas was born in Rota, Province of Cádiz. He made his first-team – and La Liga – debut on 3 May 2009, playing 83 minutes in a 0–2 home loss against Atlético Madrid. The Andalusians were ultimately relegated at the season's end.

Cañas was definitely promoted to Betis' main squad for 2010–11. He contributed 15 games during the campaign (only four starts however) as the club returned to the top flight after two years as champions, being a regular the following two seasons.

Swansea City
In April 2013, before the season in Spain was over, Cañas refused to renew his expiring contract with Betis, choosing instead to join Swansea City on a three-year deal. He made his debut on 1 August, coming on as a late substitute in a 4–0 home victory over Malmö FF in the first leg of the third qualifying round of the UEFA Europa League.

Espanyol
On 1 September 2014, Cañas returned to his country and its top division, joining RCD Espanyol on a three-year contract on a free transfer. His first competitive appearance took place 13 days later, as he played the last ten minutes of a 3–1 defeat at Valencia CF.

During his tenure at the Estadi Cornellà-El Prat, Cañas appeared in 48 games in all competitions. 2015–16 was marred by injury problems.

PAOK
On 11 July 2016, PAOK FC announced the signing of Cañas until the summer of 2019, for an undisclosed fee. On 2 April 2017 he scored his first goal as a professional, in a 2–0 home win against Athlitiki Enosi Larissa FC.

Cañas was part of the squad that won the Greek Cup three years in a row, totalling 16 matches and two goals in these achievements.

Red Star
Cañas joined Red Star Belgrade as a free agent in late June 2019, agreeing to a two-year contract. He made his debut under coach Vladan Milojević in a friendly on 1 July with FC Blau-Weiß Linz, which was won 3–1. When his new team qualified for the group stage of the UEFA Champions League, he was among the players who celebrated riding around Belgrade in an armored vehicle.

Later years
In August 2020, Cañas returned to his country and signed a one-year deal with CD Atlético Baleares in the Segunda División B. He left after one sole season, even tough the club tried hard to convince him to renew his link.

In August 2021, the 34-year-old Cañas agreed to a one-year contract with Ionikos F.C. in a return to the Super League Greece.

Personal life
Cañas' uncle, Juan José, was also a footballer and a midfielder. He too spent most of his professional career with Betis.

Club statistics

Honours
PAOK
Super League Greece: 2018–19
Greek Football Cup: 2016–17, 2017–18, 2018–19

Red Star
Serbian SuperLiga: 2019–20

References

External links

1987 births
Living people
People from Rota, Andalusia
Sportspeople from the Province of Cádiz
Spanish footballers
Footballers from Andalusia
Association football midfielders
La Liga players
Segunda División players
Segunda División B players
Tercera División players
Betis Deportivo Balompié footballers
Real Betis players
RCD Espanyol footballers
CD Atlético Baleares footballers
Premier League players
Swansea City A.F.C. players
Super League Greece players
PAOK FC players
Ionikos F.C. players
Serbian SuperLiga players
Red Star Belgrade footballers
Spanish expatriate footballers
Expatriate footballers in Wales
Expatriate footballers in Greece
Expatriate footballers in Serbia
Spanish expatriate sportspeople in Wales
Spanish expatriate sportspeople in Greece
Spanish expatriate sportspeople in Serbia